The umbilical fascia (or umbilicovesical fascia) is a thin fascial layer that extends between the medial umbilical ligaments from the umbilicus, and extends inferiorly, becoming continuous with the visceral fascia enclosing the urinary bladder.

References

Fascia
Musculoskeletal system
Abdomen